St. Mary High School is a private, Roman Catholic high school in Paducah, Kentucky.  It is located in the Roman Catholic Diocese of Owensboro, and is part of the St. Mary School System, which also includes elementary and middle schools.

Background
Founded in 1858 it has 98% of graduates attending college and 50% receiving scholarships.  It has state champions in many sports teams and an award-winning music program.

Fight song
Saint Mary Fight Song
Oh, When the Saint Mary Vikings come on the floor!
We're going to show everyone that we can score!
We're going to fight, fight, fight for Saint Mary High!
We're going to raise that score high up into the sky,
and when you see those colors gold and blue,
it is a sign that we are coming through!
We're going to knock you guys out on the floor out the door,
Saint Mary High. Hey!

State champions
 Boys Cross Country: 1998
 Individual Boys Cross Country: Matthew Shoulta(2003, 2004), James Maglasang(2008)
 Girls Cross Country: 1994, 1995, 1996
 Individual Girls Cross Country: Adrienne Lima(1994), Jackie Wagner(1997, 1998, 2000)
 Boys Golf: 2005
 Individual Boys Golf: Russ Cochran(1975), Case Cochran(2005, 2006)

Notable alumni
 Paducah Artist, Yeiser Art Museum, the late Mary Yeiser, 1921
 Former KY State Justice Most Honorable Bill Graves, 1954
 Paducah Businessman, the late Fred Paxton, 1950
 Russ Cochran, current PGA Tour golfer, KHSAA Individual Boys' Golf State Champion, 1975

Notes and references

External links
 St. Mary School System site

Roman Catholic Diocese of Owensboro
Catholic secondary schools in Kentucky
Buildings and structures in Paducah, Kentucky
Schools in McCracken County, Kentucky